Coomooroo is a rural locality in the Mid North region of South Australia.

Most of Coomooroo on its current boundaries lies within the District Council of Orroroo Carrieton; however, a small section on its western end lies within the District Council of Mount Remarkable. The Orroroo Carrieton section consists of a diagonal rural strip of the cadastral Hundred of Coomooroo separating the towns of Morchard and Walloway, with narrow strips of the Hundreds of Eurelia and Pinda at its north-western end.

The locality is named after the hundred, which in turn was named by Governor Anthony Musgrave in 1875 after a word for "small food seeds" in an Aboriginal language. The area had locally been known as Poverty Corner, but was formally named Coomooroo at the request of the Mount Remarkable council.

The historic Pekina Run Ruins, located at the south-eastern tip of Coomooroo, are listed on the South Australian Heritage Register.

References

Towns in South Australia